Eleanor Rhode is a British Theatre Director and Artistic Director of Snapdragon Productions, which she founded with Producer Sarah Loader.

Selected work
King John by William Shakespeare, Swan Theatre, January - March 2020 
Teddy by Tristan Bernays and Dougal Irvine, Watermill Theatre and UK Tour 2018 
Boudica by Tristan Bernays, Globe Theatre 2017 
When We Were Women by Sharman Macdonald (Orange Tree Theatre, 2015)  
Teddy by Tristan Bernays and Dougal Irvine (Southwark Playhouse, 2015)  
For All That - a musical by Alan Bryce (Centerstage Theatre, Seattle, 2015) 
Toast  by Richard Bean (The Park Theatre, 2014)  
Thark by Ben Travers (The Park Theatre, 2013) 
The Drawer Boy by Michael Healey (Finborough Theatre, 2012) 
A Life by Hugh Leonard (Finborough Theatre, 2012) 
Generous by Michael Healey (Finborough Theatre, 2010)

References

Living people
Year of birth missing (living people)
British theatre directors